The role of salt in the Bible is relevant to understanding Hebrew society during the Old Testament and New Testament periods. Salt is a necessity of life and was a mineral that was used since ancient times in many cultures as a seasoning, a preservative, a disinfectant, a component of ceremonial offerings, and as a unit of exchange. The Bible contains numerous references to salt. In various contexts, it is used metaphorically to signify permanence, loyalty, durability, fidelity, usefulness, value, and purification.

Salt sources in Ancient Israel
The face of the ridge is constantly changing as weather interacts with the rock salt.  highlights the importance of the Dead Sea's salt.

The Hebrew people harvested salt by pouring sea water into pits and letting the water evaporate until only salt was left. They used the mineral for seasoning and as a preservative. In addition, salt was used to disinfect wounds.
In  King Abijah referred to God's covenant promise to David that he will not lack a man to seat on Israel's throne as a salt covenant, a covenant that can never be broken.

Old Testament

This is the reason for the naming of the pillar on Mount Sodom, which is often called "Lot's Wife".

 and  illustrate the requirement of salt as part of ancient Hebrew religious sacrifices. Leviticus 2:13 reads: "And every offering of your grain offering you shall season with salt; you shall not allow the salt of the covenant of your God to be lacking from your grain offering. With all your offerings you shall offer salt."

Salt was cast on the burnt offering (Ezekiel ) and was part of the incense (Exodus ). Part of the temple offering included salt (Ezra ).

Salt was widely and variably used as a symbol and sacred sign in ancient Israel  and  illustrate salt as a covenant of friendship. In cultures throughout the region, the eating of salt is a sign of friendship.

Newborn babies were rubbed with salt. A reference to this practice is in Ezekiel : "As for your nativity, on the day you were born your navel cord was not cut, nor were you washed in water to cleanse you; you were not rubbed with salt nor wrapped in swaddling cloths."

New Testament
The Salt and Light passages in the Sermon on the Mount make reference to salt. Matthew's account differs slightly from that of Luke and Mark. Matthew 5:13 refers to his disciples as "the salt of the earth." This meaning is paralleled in the following verse, Matthew 5:14, in the symbolism of the "light of the world." Another view is that the Salt and Light passages refer to a duality of roles in the disciples to be like a light from a city, viewable from all over the world, and to be spread out as salt is: to congregate and spread.  Matthew, Mark, and Luke accord in the discussion of salt "that has lost its taste." This is a reference to salt that is contaminated with other minerals, causing a weakness in flavor or a bland unpleasant taste. It may be a symbolic reference to the possibility of abandoning or deviating from the gospel, especially due to the adulteration of its teachings. Another interpretation is that in a world filled with sin and deceit, it is possible for one to become contaminated and thus unsuccessful at being an effective disciple. Therefore, this verse serves as a warning for disciples to be on their guard; to be in the world, but not of the world.

 speaks about the salting of the condemned, which is a rhetorical device indicating the severity of the punishment.  reads in part: "Have salt in yourselves, and be at peace with one another." The salt in this verse refers to the goodwill that "seasons" positive relationships between people. This is also a play on the covenant of salt, indicating friendship and compassion. Colossians 4:6 uses the metaphor of salt seasoning speech to indicate speaking with intelligence and consideration.

See also
Covenant of salt
Salt and light

Notes

Bibliography
McKenzie, John L. Dictionary of the Bible. Simon and Schuster, 1995. .

Biblical topics
History of salt